John Warren Smart (born 20 February 1965) is a Canadian freestyle skier. He was born in Témiscamingue. He competed at the 1992 Winter Olympics in Albertville, where he placed fifth in moguls, and at the 1994 Winter Olympics in Lillehammer, where he placed seventh in moguls.

References

1965 births
Living people
Sportspeople from Quebec
Canadian male freestyle skiers
Freestyle skiers at the 1992 Winter Olympics
Freestyle skiers at the 1994 Winter Olympics
Olympic freestyle skiers of Canada